Applied Signal Technology (also known as AST) is a provider of advanced intelligence, surveillance and reconnaissance (ISR) products, systems, and services, established in 1984 in Sunnyvale, California. Its 2009 revenue was $202.6 million with a profit of $22.9 million. Its current President and CEO is William B. Van Vleet III. AST serves the defense, intelligence, homeland security, and select commercial markets.

Its products are used to scan and filter cell phone, ship-to-shore, microwave, and military transmissions and evaluate them for relevant information.

In December 2010, AST agreed to be acquired by military contractor Raytheon for $490 million.

References

External links
Applied Signal Technology - Official website

Companies based in Sunnyvale, California